Tracy Municipal Airport  is three miles (5 km) southwest of Tracy, in San Joaquin County, California. It is owned by the City of Tracy.

Most U.S. airports use the same three-letter location identifier for the FAA and IATA, but Tracy Municipal Airport is TCY to the FAA and has no IATA code.

Facilities 

In the year ending May 17, 2017, the Tracy Municipal airport had 60,000 aircraft operations, average 161 per day: 99% general aviation and 1% air taxi. 107 aircraft are based at the airport: 80 single engine, 4 multi-engine, 1 jet, 2 helicopters and 20 ultralight.

World War II
During World War II, the airport was Tracy Auxiliary Airfield (No 4), and was an auxiliary training airfield for Stockton Army Airfield, California.

See also

 California World War II Army Airfields

References

External links 
Tracy Municipal Airport  at City of Tracy web site

Tracy, California
Airports in San Joaquin County, California
San Joaquin Valley
Airfields of the United States Army Air Forces in California
United States Army airfields